Petros S. Kokkalis (born 26 February 1970) is a Greek businessman and member of the European Parliament.

Biography
Petros Kokkalis holds a B.A. from Hampshire College with a concentration in history; his Division III title was "Making the Love of My People: Constructing Legitimacy for the Monarchy in Late 19th Century Greece.” He earned his M.P.A. at the John F. Kennedy School of Government at Harvard University, where he serves as a member of the Dean's Alumni Leadership Council. He was the  Vice-President and shareholder of Intracom Holdings, one of the largest multinational technology groups in South-Eastern Europe, and the Vice-President and shareholder of Intralot S.A., a gaming technology supplier and lottery licensed operator. He was also the Vice-President of the Greek football club Olympiacos, and is the Vice-President of the Kokkalis Foundation, a non-profit organization that promotes education and training, culture and social welfare, medical research and information technology, and athletics, both in Greece and abroad. He is Secretary General of Organization Earth, an environmental education NGO. He was elected as a Member of the European Parliament in the 2019 Euroelections with SYRIZA.

References

External links
The Kokkalis Foundation
Kokkalis Program on Southeastern and East-Central Europe, Harvard University

1970 births
Living people
Politicians from Athens
Greek football chairmen and investors
Businesspeople from Athens
Harvard Kennedy School alumni
Hampshire College alumni
MEPs for Greece 2019–2024
Syriza MEPs